The 2021–22 Serie A1 is the 77th season of the highest professional Italian Women's Volleyball League. The season takes place from October to April and is contested by fourteen teams.

Format
The regular season consists of 26 rounds, where the fourteen participating teams play each other twice (once home and once away). At the completion of the regular season, the eight best teams advance to the playoffs and the teams finishing in 13th and 14th are relegated to Serie A2.

The standings criteria are:
highest number of result points (points awarded for results: 3 points for 3–0 or 3–1 wins, 2 points for 3–2 win, 1 point for 2–3 loss);
highest number of matches won;
highest set quotient (the number of total sets won divided by the number of total sets lost);
highest points quotient (the number of total points scored divided by the number of total points conceded).

Teams

Regular season

League table

Results table

Championship play–offs
 All times are local, Central European Summer Time (UTC+02:00).

Bracket

Quarterfinals

Semifinals

Final

Prosecco DOC Imoco Volley Conegliano wins series, 3–1.

Final standings

References

External links
 Official website 

2020–21
Italy, women
Italy Serie A1
Italy Serie A1
Volleyball
Volleyball